Pandora, is a village and union council of Gujar Khan tehsil in the Rawalpindi district of Punjab, Pakistan . Its location is adjacent to the Grand Trunk Road. It is located at 33°39'0N 73°4'0E with an altitude of 505 metres (1660 feet).

References

Villages in Gujar Khan Tehsil